Guadalupe Outlier is an Ancestral Puebloan site in Chaco Culture National Historical Park, in New Mexico, United States. Guadalupe Outlier is the easternmost of the Chacoan ruins and was occupied from roughly 920 to 1130 AD. By the late thirteenth century it had been "remodeled and occupied by a Mesa Verde population". The site was excavated by Lonnie C. Pippin between 1972 and 1975 as part of Eastern New Mexico University's Rio Puerco Valley Archaeological Project. The evidence from Guadalupe Ruin reveals some of these Chaco outliers were established only shortly after the initial development of the Great Pueblos in Chaco Canyon. Throughout their histories, these Chaco outliers were closely related to organized developments in Chaco Canyon and were tied to the Great Houses in the canyon by a network of roads. Nevertheless, despite the architectural similarities and networks of communication between Chaco outliers and the Great Pueblos in Chaco Canyon, the occupants of outlying Chaco towns such as Guadalupe Ruin had a material culture like that of the regionally differentiated village populations.

Gallery
Chacoan Outlier: "Guadalupe Outlier".

References

Ancestral Puebloans
Archaeological sites in New Mexico